Burnt Mountain is a summit in the Adirondack Mountains, located in Herkimer County, New York, USA. It is located east-southeast of Old Forge in the Town of Webb. Fernow Mountain is located north-northeast and McCauley Mountain is located west of Burnt Mountain.

References

Mountains of Herkimer County, New York
Mountains of New York (state)